Trou aux Cerfs (also known as Murr's Volcano) is a dormant volcano with a well-defined cone and crater. The crater has been alternately described as 300 and 350 meters in diameter, and is 80 meters deep.

The crater was formed less than 2 million years ago in the second phase of volcanic activity that created Mauritius. 

According to experts, the volcano is currently dormant but could become active at any time within the next thousand years.

The crater is only accessible down a steep embankment which is considered dangerous. Water and silt have clogged the crater, making it even less accessible.

References

Volcanoes of Mauritius
Dormant volcanoes
Curepipe